Sergio Irredento (born 12 April 1953) is an Italian former swimmer. He competed in the men's 1500 metre freestyle at the 1972 Summer Olympics.

References

External links
 

1953 births
Living people
Olympic swimmers of Italy
Swimmers at the 1972 Summer Olympics
Sportspeople from Trieste
Italian male freestyle swimmers